Evangelisti is a surname, and may refer to:

 Alessandro Evangelisti (born 1981), Italian footballer
 Franco Evangelisti (composer) (1926–1980), Italian composer
 Franco Evangelisti (politician), (1923–1993) Italian politician
 Giovanni Evangelisti (born 1961), Italian long jumper
 Mattia Evangelisti, (born 1991), Italian footballer
 Valerio Evangelisti (born 1952), Italian writer of science fiction, fantasy and horror

Italian-language surnames
Occupational surnames

it:Evangelisti (disambigua)